SJD can refer to:

 Kildin Sámi, a language spoken on the Kola peninsula (ISO 639-3 language code sjd)
 Sir John Deanes, a sixth form college in Northwich, England
 SJD (musician) (Sean James Donnelly), a musician from New Zealand
 Doctor of Juridical Science (S.J.D.), a doctorate degree
 The IATA airport code for Los Cabos International Airport which serves San José del Cabo and Cabo San Lucas, Mexico
 Socialist Janata (Democratic), a political party in India